"Can't Believe the Way We Flow" is a song by English electronic music producer and singer-songwriter James Blake from his fourth album, Assume Form. It was written by Blake and contained a sample of "It Feels So Good to Be Loved So Bad", written by Roger Joyce, Victoria Pike and Teddy Randazzo, performed by The Manhattans.

Production
During the "Verified" segment interview with Genius, Blake revealed the process of creating the song:
The point at which we made this song in this record was a turning point in the sense that I realized that I could make a happier album. That actually, the way I felt now, however it was I was feeling, needed to be the way the record sounded. This song was particularly pivotal in how the record ended up for me.

About the "It Feels So Good to Be Loved So Bad" sample, Blake revealed that it "brought so many ideas to the table". He further said that as soon as Dominic Maker brought and played it, the mood of the session changed and Blake said that he "had to get on it".

Critical reception
Upon the release of Assume Form, "Can't Believe the Way We Flow" was met with favourable reviews. Brian Howe of The A.V. Club called it as the highlight track of the album. Howe said: "['Can't Believe the Way We Flow'] recalls the Blake of yore, but instead of scissoring sideways through time, he contents himself with cutting it into lacy symmetries, like a child making paper snowflakes—just an elegant whir, the vocal floating atop it with open-hearted emotion." Fred Thomas of AllMusic described the track as "standing blissfully awestruck at the brilliance of true love." Comparing it to "It Feels So Good to Be Loved So Bad", Alexis Petridis of The Guardian called it "a blissful, lovely update of the sound that emerged" while he said that "practitioners of soft 70s soul keyed into the sleepy, small-hours feel of doo-wop ballads" about the latter track. Writing for The Independent, Helen Brown compared the melody to Etta James' "I'd Rather Go Blind", described it as "the sonic sky around it fills with doo-wop syllables that glow like paper lanterns."

Music video
The accompanying music video for "Can't Believe the Way We Flow" was released on 7 August 2019. It was directed by Frank Lebon. The video features montage of scenes between thirty real-life couples living in London and highlights the highs and lows of a relationship.

Lebon was nominated for the Best Editing at the 2020 MTV Video Music Awards.

Personnel
James Blake – vocals, production, synthesizer, piano, mixing, programming
John Armstrong – recording engineer assistance
Nathan Boddy – mixing
Dominic Maker – co-production, programming
Eric Eylands – recording engineer assistance

Credits adapted from Tidal.

Charts

References

2019 songs
James Blake (musician) songs
Songs written by James Blake (musician)